Scelidotheriidae is a family of extinct ground sloths within the order Pilosa, suborder Folivora and superfamily Mylodontoidea, related to the other extinct mylodontoid family, Mylodontidae, as well as to the living two-toed sloth family Choloepodidae. The only other extant family of the suborder Folivora is the distantly related Bradypodidae. Erected as the family Scelidotheriidae by Ameghino in 1889, the taxon was demoted to a subfamily by Gaudin in 1995. However, recent collagen sequence data indicates the group is less closely related to Mylodon and Lestodon than Choloepus is, and thus it has been elevated back to full family status by Presslee et al. (2019).

Taxonomy 
Together with Mylodontidae, and the two-toed sloths, the scelidotheriids form the superfamily Mylodontoidea. Chubutherium is an ancestral and very plesiomorphic member of this family and does not belong to the main group of closely related genera.

Phylogeny
The following sloth family phylogenetic tree is based on collagen and mitochondrial DNA sequence data (see Fig. 4 of Presslee et al., 2019).

Below is a more detailed cladogram of the Scelidotheriidae, based on the work of Nieto et al. 2020.

References

Further reading 
  (1796): Notice sur le squellette d'une très grande espèce de quadrupède inconnue jusqu'à présent, trouvé au Paraquay, et déposé au cabinet d'histoire naturelle de Madrid.  Magasin encyopédique, ou Journal des Sciences, des Lettres et des Arts (1): 303-310; (2): 227-228.
 
  (1993): Yukon Beringia Interpretive Center - Jefferson's Ground Sloth. Retrieved 2008-JAN-24.
  (2008): Cueva del Milodon, Megalithic Portal. Retrieved 2008-APR-13
 
 
  (1999): Walker's Mammals of the World (Vol. 2). Johns Hopkins University Press, London.

External links 

 Sloth World: An Online Sloth Bibliography
 Picture and information about a ground sloth skeleton on display at the University of Georgia's Science Library
 Have some ground sloths survived in Argentina?
 Ground sloths in general
 Western Center for Archaeology and Paleontology Hemet, CA

Prehistoric sloths
Prehistoric mammal families
Oligocene xenarthrans
Miocene xenarthrans
Pliocene xenarthrans
Pleistocene xenarthrans
Chattian first appearances
Holocene extinctions
Paleogene mammals of South America
Neogene mammals of South America
Pleistocene mammals of South America
Fossil taxa described in 1890
Taxa named by Florentino Ameghino